Sucha  is a village in the administrative district of Gmina Strzelce Opolskie, within Strzelce County, Opole Voivodeship, in south-western Poland.

The village has an approximate population of 685.

References

Sucha